Anne Holm, born Else Anne Jørgensen (10 September 1922 – 27 December 1998) was a Danish journalist and children's writer. She also wrote under the pseudonym Adrien de Chandelle.

Career 
Her best-known fiction book is I Am David (1963), adapted for a 2003 film; (also published as North to Freedom), which tells the story of a 12-year-old boy who escapes from a concentration camp and travels through Europe. It won the ALA Notable Book award in 1965, the 1963 Best Scandinavian Children's Book award and the Boys Club of America Junior Book Award Gold Medal.

Holm also authored Peter (1966), which tells the story of a teenage boy who travels in time to Ancient Greece and Medieval England.

Personal life 
She married Johan C. Holm in 1949. They had a son and two grandchildren at the time of her passing.

Bibliography 

 I Am David (1963)
 Peter (1966)
 Adam og de voksne (1967)
 The Hostage (1980)
 Grew Red (1992)

References

 Gale Children's Literature Review, vol. 75, 136–141
 Gale Contemporary Authors, vol. 17
 Kraks Blaa Bog (Danish Who's Who)

1922 births
1998 deaths
Danish children's writers
Danish women children's writers
Danish women journalists
20th-century Danish journalists